Maval Assembly constituency is one of the 288 constituencies of Maharashtra Vidhan Sabha located and 21 in the Pune district.

It is a part of the Maval (Lok Sabha constituency) along with five other assembly constituencies: Pimpri and Chinchwad from the Pune District and Karjat, Uran and Panvel from the Raigad district.

Members of Legislative Assembly

See also
 Maval

References

Assembly constituencies of Pune district
Assembly constituencies of Maharashtra